|}

The Mersey Novices' Hurdle is a Grade One National Hunt hurdle race in Great Britain which is open to horses aged four years or older. It is run at Aintree, Merseyside, over a distance of about 2 miles and 4 furlongs (4,023 metres), and during its running there are eleven hurdles to be jumped. The race is for novice hurdlers, and it is scheduled to take place each year during the Grand National meeting in early April.

The distance of the race was cut by a furlong to its present length in 1988. For a period it was sponsored by Mumm, and it was given Grade Two status in 1991. It has had several different sponsors since 1992, and the latest of these, Betway, began supporting the event in 2017. The Mersey Novices' Hurdle was upgraded to Grade One by the British Horseracing Authority from its 2014 running.

The Mersey Novices' Hurdle often features horses which ran previously in the Ballymore Novices' Hurdle, and the last to achieve victory in both races was Yorkhill in 2016.

Winners since 1977

See also
 Horse racing in Great Britain
 List of British National Hunt races

References

 Racing Post:

 aintree.co.uk – 2010 John Smith's Grand National Media Guide.
 pedigreequery.com – Mersey Novices' Hurdle – Aintree.

National Hunt races in Great Britain
Aintree Racecourse
National Hunt hurdle races